This is a list of provincial parks in Central Ontario. These provincial parks are maintained by Ontario Parks. For a list of other provincial parks in Ontario, see the List of provincial parks in Ontario.

Dufferin County

Haliburton County

Hastings County

Kawartha Lakes

Northumberland County

Muskoka District Municipality

Peterborough County

Prince Edward County

Simcoe County 

Ontario
Provincial parks, Central Ontario
Provincial parks in Canada
Central Ontario